Maria do Carmo do Nascimento Alves (born August 23, 1941) is a Brazilian politician. She had represented Sergipe in the Federal Senate from 1999 to 2023. She is a member of Progressistas (PP).

She voted in favor of impeaching Dilma Rousseff.

References

|-

Living people
1941 births
Members of the Federal Senate (Brazil)
Democrats (Brazil) politicians
Brazil Union politicians
People from Sergipe
Progressistas politicians